The Fast and the Furious is a 1954 American crime drama B movie from a story written by Roger Corman and screenplay by Jean Howell and Jerome Odlum. The film stars John Ireland and Dorothy Malone. Ireland also served as the film's co-director.

The Fast and the Furious was the first film produced for the American Releasing Corporation, who would become the  American International Pictures company. It was the second feature produced by Roger Corman.

Plot
Charged with a murder he did not commit, truck driver Frank Webster (John Ireland) has broken out of jail. While on the run toward the Mexico–United States border, and the subject of radio news reports, he is cornered in a small Southern California coffee shop by a zealous citizen who is suspicious of the stranger. Frank manages to escape and, as he gets away, kidnaps a young woman named Connie (Dorothy Malone).

Frank drives off with Connie in her Jaguar sports car. She soon proves a difficult hostage, trying to escape a few times, which leads him to treat her more roughly than they both would prefer. This mutual struggle soon leads the two to fall in love.

Continuing to elude police, the couple slips into a cross-border sports car race, which Frank plans to use to his advantage to escape into Mexico. Faber (Bruce Carlisle), one of Connie's friends, is wary of the new stranger driving her car and tries to learn more about Frank.

During the race, Frank abandons his chance to escape when he chooses to aid Faber who has crashed into a truck after a dramatic railway crossing. Out of sympathy for Frank and a desire to be with him, Connie gives Frank the keys to her car,  so he might escape capture and trial. At the last moment, Frank also decides it is better to take the keys and escape to Mexico than to turn himself in and somehow find a future with Connie. The movie ends with his successful entry into Mexico and him driving off into the sunset.

Cast

 John Ireland as Frank Webster
 Dorothy Malone as Connie Adair
 Bruce Carlisle as Faber
 Iris Adrian as Wilma Belding
 Marshall Bradford as Mr. Hillman
 Snub Pollard as a park caretaker

Production
The film was based on a story by Roger Corman, who had recently moved into producing with Monster from the Ocean Floor. His production company was Palo Alto Productions. Corman financed the movie himself with $60,000 he received from Robert Lippert for Monster.

Corman says that John Ireland only appeared in the film on the condition he could direct it. "John did a fine job directing on a nine-day shoot with a budget of $50,000," said Corman later. Corman also said that Dorothy Malone "had left her agent and, having no work, accepted a part for next to nothing."

The film was shot in 10 days in April 1954 under the title Crashout. (Another film would take that title).

Corman says he "set up a little of the racing car business because I was interested in that, and I did some of the second unit stuff. But I didn't direct as such."

The deal that Corman set up included having the local Jaguar dealer donate his cars as well as having scenes take place at the Monterey race track. Most of the exteriors were shot around Malibu and Point Dume, California. Corman also subbed as a driver in the second of the Jaguar XK120 race cars.

After having to operate as a second unit cinematographer and director, Corman realized he wanted to direct himself. "It was after that film that I decided to become a director."

Distribution
After weighing offers from Columbia, Allied and Republic, Corman made a deal for  The Fast and the Furious to be picked up for distribution by a new company, American Releasing Corporation, formed by Sam Arkoff and James H. Nicholson. Corman said "I realized that the trap for an independent producer was that you made a picture but waited a long time to get your money back. So you couldn't make many films. And what I wanted to do was to get an advance back immediately to make a series of films." Corman says he told ARC "I would give them the film if they would give me all of my money back immediately as an advance against distribution and I would do the same thing on three more films, so I could set myself up as a producer. They were happy to do that because The Fast and the Furious enabled them to start their company. It then meant that I would be able to be a steady supplier of films for them, and they could get their company rolling."

The company's formation was announced in October 1954, with The Fast and the Furious to be their first release. Corman's Palo Alto company planned to make three more features over the next twelve months, starting with Five Guns West in November. ARC later became the famous American International Pictures.

Reception

Critical
Variety said "High-priced sportscar bombs furnish most of the action" saying "Racing footage is interesting but becomes repetitious and helps to string out the running time to an unnecessary 73 minutes, an unhandy length for supporting playdates."

Film critic Leonard Maltin dismissed The Fast and the Furious as labored by "uninspired romantic interludes and cops-on-the-chase sequences." CEA Film called the film "a modest second feature."

Box office
The film was popular but struggled to recoup money for ARC because it often played on the bottom of double bills, which meant it received a flat fee instead of a percentage. Alex Gordon confirmed that saying "it soon became obvious that single B-pictures like these first three [Fast and Furious, Five Guns West, Apache Woman] would not work out for the new  company— they played the bottom of twin- bill programming at $25 per booking. AIP would have to own both pictures to obtain percentage bookings." This would prompt AIP to make movies as a package for release as a double bill.

However by August 1955 Corman claimed he had repaid his twelve main investors in the film.

Legacy
The film was successful enough to garner Corman a three movie deal. 

Decades later, producer Neal H. Moritz and Universal Pictures licensed the title for 2001's The Fast and the Furious. Moritz said that he had difficulty choosing between proposed titles such as Racer X, Redline, Race Wars, and Street Wars, and was inspired by a documentary on American International Pictures that included Corman's film. Moritz was able to trade the use of some stock footage to Corman for use of the title.

Corman recalled the story differently in a 2022 interview, stating that Moritz had been struggling to name his new film and had turned to his father, a former AIP executive. His father suggested reusing the effective title of the earlier Roger Corman film. Moritz negotiated the rights to use the title from Corman, although Corman retained the right to make numerical sequels in the future (e.g. "The Fast and the Furious 2").

See also
 List of American films of 1954
 List of films in the public domain in the United States

References

Citations

Bibliography

 Arkoff, Samuel Z. and Richard Turbo. Flying Through Hollywood By the Seat of My Pants. New York: Birch Lane Press, 1992. .
 Corman, Roger and Jim Jerome. How I Made a Hundred Movies in Hollywood and Never lost a Dime. London: Lars Müller Publishers, 1990. .
 Frank, Alan. The Films of Alan Frank: Shooting My Way Out of Trouble. Bath, UK: Bath Press, 1998. .
 Maltin, Leonard. Leonard Maltin's 2012 Movie Guide. New York: Plume, 2011. .
 McGee, Mark.Faster and Furiouser: The Revised and Fattened Fable of American International Pictures. Jefferson, North Carolina: McFarland & Company, 1996. .

External links

 
 
 
 
 
 

1954 films
1950s English-language films
American detective films
American International Pictures films
Films directed by John Ireland
American auto racing films
Articles containing video clips
1954 crime films
Films shot in California
Films shot in Los Angeles County, California
Films set in California
Films produced by Roger Corman
American black-and-white films
1950s American films